Hugh Smith (16 October 1910 – 7 May 1963) was a British swimmer. He competed in the men's 200 metre breaststroke event at the 1928 Summer Olympics.

References

1910 births
1963 deaths
British male swimmers
Olympic swimmers of Great Britain
Swimmers at the 1928 Summer Olympics
Place of birth missing
British male breaststroke swimmers